The Maple River is a river in the United States. The Maple River rises in Buena Vista County, and flows generally southwest through Ida Grove, Battle Creek, Danbury, and Mapleton finally joining with the Little Sioux River near Turin. Much of the river has been channelized.

The Maple River was named from the soft maple trees along its banks.

See also
List of Iowa rivers

References

Rivers of Iowa
Rivers of Buena Vista County, Iowa
Rivers of Ida County, Iowa
Rivers of Woodbury County, Iowa
Rivers of Monona County, Iowa